Francis Finch may refer to:

Francis Finch (MP for Winchelsea) (c. 1602–1677), English politician
Francis Finch (MP for Walsall) (died 1874), British Liberal Party politician
Francis Finch (MP for Eye) (1585–?), English lawyer and politician
Francis Oliver Finch (1802–1862), English watercolourist
Francis Miles Finch (1827–1907), American poet, academic and judge

See also
Frances Finch (disambiguation)